Rubus uniformis is a North American species of bristleberry in section Setosi of the genus Rubus, a member of the rose family. It is locally common in the prairie-forest transition zone of Minnesota and Wisconsin in the north-central United States. It is also recorded from Michigan.

Rubus uniformis is usually found in surface-dry to wet ecotonal (transitional) communities between shallow wetlands or brushlands and forested uplands dominated by oaks (Quercus), quaking aspen (Populus tremuloides), or pines (Pinus banksiana, P. resinosa). These habitats are grassy, sedgy, or brushy, situated in full sunlight to moderate shade.

References

uniformis
Plants described in 1947
Flora of Minnesota
Flora of Wisconsin
Flora without expected TNC conservation status